Gajar ka halwa, also known as gajorer halua, gajrela, gajar pak, and carrot halwa is a carrot-based sweet dessert pudding made by placing grated carrots in a pot containing a specific amount of water, milk and sugar, cardamom and then cooking while stirring regularly. It is often served with a garnish of almonds and pistachios. The nuts and other items used are first sautéed in ghee, a type of clarified butter from the Indian subcontinent.

The dessert is traditionally eaten during all of the festivals in India, mainly on the occasion of Diwali, Holi, Eid al-Fitr and Raksha Bandhan. It is served hot during the winter.

Description
Gajar ka halwa is a combination of nuts, milk, sugar, khoya and ghee with grated carrot. It is a light nutritious dessert with less fat (a minimum of 10.03% and an average of 12.19%) than many other typical sweet from the Indian subcontinent. Gajar halwa has a medium shelf life so it is now sometimes exported.

At festival time many people prefer vegetarian dishes as well as desserts in their Thali. Because of its low fat content, vegetarian characteristics, ease of making, medium shelf-life and taste Gajar ka halwa is a popular dessert all over India and often served at most festivals. The dish is popular among adults as well as children. In 300 grams of gajar halwa there are 268 calories (76 come from fat, 180 from carbohydrate and 16 from protein).

Origins
Gajar ka Halwa or Gajar Pak is made from carrot (in Hindi: gajar) . Gajar ka halwa originally contained carrots, milk and ghee but nowadays includes many other ingredients like mava (khoya).  Being a combination of milk and carrots it is known as milk flavored gajar ka halwa  but in the other case, the combination of cream or mava (khoya) and carrot is described as mava flavored gajar ka halwa.

Recipe and ingredients
The main ingredients of gajar ka halwa are freshly grated carrots, milk, sugar, cardamom, khoya, and ghee. The quantity and quality may vary according to personal taste. In the sugar free variant, sugar is excluded from the recipe. For cooking gajar ka halwa, a cooker or kadai is usually preferred. Vasundhara Chauhan, writing for The Hindu, writes that gajar ka halwa should be slow-cooked and that using a pressure cooker spoils the dish. Carrots must first be grated and then dried before cooking. The grated carrots are then put into a heated pan with a specific amount of milk or khoya and sugar. After stirring for 4–5 minutes, roughly chopped cashew nuts are added and 10–15 minutes later a specific amount of pure ghee is added as well. Finally, it is often served with a garnish of almonds and pistachios.

Variations

In the carrot-papaya halwa, equal amounts of carrot and papaya are used. First, a mixture of carrot and papaya scrapings is prepared. This mixture is fried in a kadai or a cooker with ghee for about five minutes. The rest of the process is same as the basic recipe. This recipe has become popular lately because papaya is added to it which provides a different flavor and taste compared to the regular gajar ka halwa. Red velvet carrot halwa is another famous variation of the gajar ka halwa. It is made by heating a comparatively large amount of milk cream along with carrots, sugar, rose water and saffron over low flame.  Red velvet carrot halwa is also a very good source of vitamin A and calcium.

Other lesser-known variations include Carrot and beetroot halwa, cheese gajar ka halwa, khajur gajar ka halwa and carrot dessert. These variations vary in popularity by regional/personal preferences, with the traditional gajar ka halwa being most popular. In the carrot and beetroot halwa, grated beetroot is added to grated carrots and this mixture is heated in a kadai on a low flame and further a specific amount of mava and sugar per choice is added to it. After 30 minutes of stirring and cooking, carrot and beetroot halwa  is ready to be served. Cheese gajar ka halwa is prepared with a combination of purple carrots and ricotta. This dish is popular in northern India because purple carrots are mostly grown there.

See also

 Indian cuisine
 Pakistani cuisine
 Bangladeshi cuisine
 Halwa
 Pudding
 List of carrot dishes
 List of Pakistani sweets and desserts
 List of Indian sweets and dessert

References

External links

Carrot dishes
Indian desserts
North Indian cuisine
Pakistani desserts
Punjabi cuisine
Halva